Ontananga is a village in the Oshikoto Region in northern Namibia. It is under the traditional rule of the Ondonga Traditional Authority.

References 

Populated places in Namibia